Tox is a peer-to-peer instant-messaging and video-calling protocol that offers end-to-end encryption. The stated goal of the project is to provide secure yet easily accessible communication for everyone. A reference implementation of the protocol is published as free and open-source software under the terms of the GNU GPL-3.0-or-later.

History 

The initial commit to GitHub was pushed on June 23, 2013, by a user named irungentoo. Pre-alpha testing binaries were made available for users from February 3, 2014, onward. On July 12, 2014, Tox entered an alpha stage in development and a redesigned download page was created for the occasion.

Features

Encryption of traffic 
Users are assigned a public and private key, and they connect to each other directly in a fully distributed, peer-to-peer network. Users have the ability to message friends, join chat rooms with friends or strangers, voice/video chat, and send each other files. All traffic over Tox is end-to-end encrypted using the NaCl library, which provides authenticated encryption and perfect forward secrecy.

Additional messaging features 
Tox clients aim to provide support for various secure and anonymised communication features; while every client supports messaging, additional features like group messaging, voice and video calling, voice and video conferencing, typing indicators, message read-receipts, file sharing, profile encryption, and desktop streaming are supported to various degrees by mobile and desktop clients. Additional features can be implemented by any client as long as they are supported by the core protocol. Features that are not related to the core networking system are left up to the client. Client developers are strongly encouraged to adhere to the Tox Client Standard in order to maintain cross-client compatibility and uphold best security practices.

Usability as an instant messenger 

Though several apps that use the Tox protocol seem similar in function to regular instant messaging apps, the lack of central servers similar to XMPP or Matrix currently has the consequence that both parties of the chat need to be online for the message to be sent and received. The Tox enabled messengers deal with this in separate ways, some prevent the user from sending the message if the other party has disconnected while others show the message as being sent when in reality it is stored in the sender's phone waiting to be delivered when the receiving party reconnects to the network.

Architecture

Core 

The Tox core is a library establishing the protocol and API. User front-ends, or clients, are built on the top of the core. Anyone can create a client utilizing the core.
Technical documents describing the design of the Core, written by the core developer irungentoo, are available publicly.

Protocol 

The core of Tox is an implementation of the Tox protocol, an example of the application layer of the OSI model and arguably the presentation layer. Implementations of the Tox protocol not done by the project exist.

Tox uses the Opus audio format for audio streaming and the VP8 video compression format for video streaming.

Encryption 

Tox uses the cryptographic primitives present in the NaCl crypto library, via libsodium. Specifically, Tox employs Curve25519 for its key exchanges, xsalsa20 for symmetric encryption, and Poly1305 for MACs. Because the tox protocol can be used by many different applications, and because the tox network broadcasts the used client, it is also possible for clients to use additional encryption when sending to clients which support the same features.

Clients 
A client is a program that uses the Tox core library to communicate with other users of the Tox protocol. Various clients are available for a wide range of systems; the following list is incomplete.

There are also Tox protocol plugins for Pidgin (abandoned since 2017, one of the forks was maintained until 2020) and Miranda NG (last updated in 2021).

Disassociation with Tox Foundation 

At July 11, 2015, Tox developers officially announced their disassociation with Tox Foundation, due to "a dispute over the misuse of donated funds" by Tox Foundation head and CEO, according to LWN.net. Due to domains being in control of the Tox Foundation, main development of the project was transferred to a new infrastructure, servers, and new domain.

Reception 

Tox received some significant publicity in its early conceptual stage, catching the attention of global online tech news sites. On August 15, 2013, Tox was number five on GitHub's top trending list.
Concerns about metadata leaks were raised, and developers responded by implementing Onion routing for the friend-finding process. Tox was accepted into the Google Summer of Code as a Mentoring Organization in 2014 and 2015.

See also

 Comparison of instant messaging clients
 Comparison of instant messaging protocols
 Comparison of VoIP software
List of free and open-source software packages

References

External links
 

2013 software
Android (operating system) software
Communication software
Cross-platform software
Distributed computing
Free communication software
Free instant messaging clients
Free software programmed in C
Instant messaging clients
Instant messaging clients for Linux
Instant messaging clients that use GTK
IOS software
MacOS instant messaging clients
Onion routing
Peer-to-peer
Secure communication
Videotelephony
VoIP protocols
VoIP software
Windows instant messaging clients